Samuel Kneeland may refer to:

 Samuel Kneeland (printer) (1696–1769), Boston printer and publisher
 Samuel Kneeland (naturalist) (1821–1888), naturalist of the United States